Gen. David Thomson House, also known as Elm Spring, is a historic home located near Hughesville, Pettis County, Missouri.  It was built in 1840, and is a two-story, five bay, Federal style brick I-house.  It has a central passage plan and one-story rear ell.  Its builder, Gen. David Thomson, previously built Longview near Georgetown, Kentucky about 1819.

It was listed on the National Register of Historic Places in 1982.

References

Houses on the National Register of Historic Places in Missouri
Federal architecture in Missouri
Houses completed in 1840
Buildings and structures in Pettis County, Missouri
National Register of Historic Places in Pettis County, Missouri